Anna Rosbach Andersen (born 2 February 1947) is a Danish politician and Member of the European Parliament.  She is an independent sitting in the European Conservatives and Reformists (ECR).  She was elected for the Danish People's Party (DF), but left in March 2011.

She joined the recently established political party Fokus, which aimed to run in the European Parliament elections in 2014.

Footnotes

External links
 European Parliament biography

1947 births
Living people
Danish People's Party MEPs
MEPs for Denmark 2009–2014
21st-century women MEPs for Denmark